Jozef Dumoulin (born 27 April 1975) is a Belgian jazz musician and composer. He plays Fender Rhodes, keyboards and piano.

Early life
Dumoulin was born in Ingelmunster, in rural Belgium. He became interested in jazz in his late teens, by hearing  Keith Jarrett and Kenny Kirkland. He initially played the piano, but owned a Fender Rhodes when he was studying jazz in Cologne when he was in his early twenties.

Later life and career
After his studies, Dumoulin got a regular job in Antwerp and began using the Fender Rhodes in preference to the poor quality piano that the venue possessed. From then, he began experimenting with the sounds that it could make and how they could be altered using effects.

In 2011 and 2013 Dumoulin recorded with the sextet Bureau of Atomic Tourism.

Dumoulin recorded a wholly improvised solo Fender Rhodes album that was released in 2014. Commenting on his preference for improvisation at that stage, he commented that "Maybe one day I'll be able to write music bringing more things together, but for now I know that the best way to get in a zone is through improvisation." His 2015 album Trust was credited to The Red Hill Orchestra, but this consisted of Dumoulin (mainly Fender Rhodes), Ellery Eskelin (tenor sax) and Dan Weiss (drums). This contained Dumoulin's "spindly, shape-shifting post-bop compositions, where extended passages  of free improvisation and quicksilver give-and-take connect groove-heavy themes."

Discography
An asterisk (*) indicates that the year is that of release.

As leader/co-leader

As sideman

References

1975 births
Belgian jazz pianists
Living people
21st-century pianists
Octurn members